Echoes of the Outlaw Roadshow is a 2013 live album from American alternative rock band Counting Crows, released on Cooking Vinyl. The album was made available by the band through digital distributors, physical media, and pre-orders for tickets to their co-headlining tour with The Wallflowers.

Track listing
"Girl from the North Country" (Bob Dylan) – 6:04
"Round Here" (David Bryson, Adam Duritz, Dave Janusko, Dan Jewett, and Chris Roldan) – 10:12
"Untitled (Love Song)" (Luke McMaster) – 4:52
"Four Days" (Adam Duritz) – 3:32
"Hospital" (Coby Brown) – 3:07
"Carriage" (Duritz) – 4:04
"Start Again" (Norman Blake) – 3:29
"I Wish I Was a Girl" (Duritz and Charlie Gillingham) – 5:48
"Sundays" (Duritz) – 4:39
"Mercury" (Duritz) – 6:37
"Friend of the Devil" (John Dawson, Jerry Garcia, and Robert Hunter) – 4:32
"Rain King" (Bryson and Duritz) – 7:38
"Le Ballet d'Or" (Duritz, Gillingham, and David Immerglück) – 5:01
"Up All Night (Frankie Miller Goes to Hollywood)" (Duritz) – 5:22
"You Ain't Goin' Nowhere" (Dylan) – 4:26

 Track #12 includes lyrics of the Elbow song "Lippy Kids".

Tour dates

Personnel
Counting Crows
Jim Bogios – drums, backing vocals
David Bryson – guitar, backing vocals
Adam Duritz – lead vocals, piano
Charlie Gillingham – accordion, keyboards, piano
David Immerglück – guitar
Millard Powers – bass guitar, backing vocals
Dan Vickrey – lead guitar, backing vocals

Charts

References

External links

Announcement of the album's release
Cooking Vinyl's page for the album

Interview with Duritz on Underwater Sunshine and Echoes of the Outlaw Roadshow hosted on Internet Archive

2013 live albums
Cooking Vinyl live albums
Counting Crows live albums